PFM may refer to:

 Federal Ministerial Police (Policía Federal Ministerial), a Mexican federal agency tasked with fighting corruption and organized crime
 Pacific Fast Mail, a manufacturer of brass model trains
 Pen For Men, a 1959 model of the Sheaffer Pen Corporation
 Personal financial management, a class of online tools and services for money tracking, budgeting, and advice
 PFM Group (Pietro Fioravanti Machinery), an Italian multinational in the packaging and weighing machinery industry
 Photonic force microscope, an optical tweezer based method to measure forces in the range of several piconewtons
 Piezoresponse force microscopy, a technique typically used to investigate and manipulate ferroelectric domains on nanoscale dimensions
 Plasma-facing material, the material used to line the reactor vessel in a fusion power reactor
 Pontefract Monkhill railway station, England, United Kingdom; National Rail station code PFM
 Porcelain Fused to Metal, the most common type of dental crown
 Premiata Forneria Marconi, an Italian progressive rock band
 Printer Font Metrics, part of a Type 1 font description used by the Microsoft Windows operating system
 Pulse-frequency modulation
 PFM, a graphic image file format from Netpbm format
 PFM, the IATA code for Primrose Aerodrome, Alberta, Canada